In mathematics, more specifically differential topology, a local diffeomorphism is intuitively a map between Smooth manifolds that preserves the local differentiable structure. The formal definition of a local diffeomorphism is given below.

Formal definition

Let  and  be differentiable manifolds. A function 
 

is a diffeomorphism. 

A local diffeomorphism is a special case of an immersion  where the image  of  under  locally has the differentiable structure of a submanifold of  Then  and  may have a lower dimension than

Characterizations

A map is a local diffeomorphism if and only if it is a smooth immersion (smooth local embedding) and an open map. 

The inverse function theorem implies that a smooth map  is a local diffeomorphism if and only if the derivative  is a linear isomorphism for all points  This implies that  and  must have the same dimension. 

A map  between two connected manifolds of equal dimension is a local diffeomorphism if and only if it is a smooth immersion (smooth local embedding), or equivalently, if and only if it is a smooth submersion. 
This is because every smooth immersion is a locally injective function while invariance of domain guarantees that any continuous injective function between manifolds of equal dimensions is necessarily an open map.

Discussion

For example, one can impose two different differentiable structures on  that make  into a differentiable manifold, but both structures are not locally diffeomorphic (see below). Although local diffeomorphisms preserve differentiable structure locally, one must be able to "patch up" these (local) diffeomorphisms to ensure that the domain is the entire (smooth) manifold. For example, there can be no global diffeomorphism from the 2-sphere to Euclidean 2-space although they do indeed have the same local differentiable structure. This is because all local diffeomorphisms are continuous, the continuous image of a compact space is compact, the sphere is compact whereas Euclidean 2-space is not.

Properties

If a local diffeomorphism between two manifolds exists then their dimensions must be equal. 
Every local diffeomorphism is also a local homeomorphism and therefore a locally injective open map. 
A local diffeomorphism has constant rank of

Examples

A diffeomorphism is a bijective local diffeomorphism. 

Local flow diffeomorphisms

See also

References

 .

Theory of continuous functions
Diffeomorphisms
Functions and mappings
 
Inverse functions